A signature crime is a crime which exhibits characteristics idiosyncratic to specific criminals, known as signature aspects, signature behaviours or signature characteristics. Where a modus operandi (MO) concerns the practical components of a crime which can also be unique to one suspect, signature aspects fulfill a psychological need and, unlike the MO, do not often change.

Two examples cited in Crime Classification Manual by John Douglas are a bank robber from Michigan who required tellers to undress during the robbery so he could photograph them, and a rape case where the perpetrator forced the husband to return home and be humiliated by the event. These characteristics move beyond modus operandi, because they fulfill a psychological need rather than a need of practical execution of the crime.

The 1898 Gatton murders also exhibited signature aspects. Following the murders, the bodies were re-arranged so their legs crossed over their bodies with the feet pointing west. Ted Bundy also used a complex series of signature behaviours.

Notes

References
Douglas, J.E., Burgess, A.W., Burgess, A.G., & Ressler, R.K. (1992). Crime classification manual: A standard system for investigating and classifying violent crimes. San Francisco, CA: Jossey-Bass.
Keppel, R.D., & Birnes, W.J. (1997). Signature killers: Interpreting the calling cards of the serial murderer. New York, NY: Pocket Books.

Criminology
Offender profiling
Criminal investigation